Mohammed Shah I (reigned 1358–1375) was the second ruler of the Bahmani Sultanate, a late medieval kingdom of India. He succeeded his father Ala-ud-Din Bahman Shah. His reign was marked by a series of wars between his kingdom and two neighboring kingdoms, the Vijayanagara and the Warangal under Kapaya Nayaka. He was succeeded by his son Alauddin Mujahid Shah.

Reign
When Mohammad inherited the newly born sultanate from his father Alauddin, the land was still infested with thieves and robbers. As such he spent the entire part of his reign in establishing law in his land. He ordered his governors to never give refuge to anyone who defied his authority. This campaign was successful and at the end of his reign,the land became peaceful and law abiding. He also sat on the takht-ē-firoza or The Turquoise throne which was gifted to him by Kapaya Nayaka.

During his time, he built the Grand mosque of Gulbarga with the help of a Persian architect named Rafi of Qazvin in 1367.

Like his father, Mohammed was involved in wars with Vijayanagara.  However he also became embroiled in wars with Warangal. Mohammed died in 1375 from drinking too much.

Mass Genocide and Atrocities 
Firishta a Persian historian notes in his book that Mohammed Shah I inflicted such a devastating blow on the Zamindars (Gowdas) of Carnatic, that he massacred 500,000 people from the land and looted wealth accumulated of 500 years. In 1364, he also plundered the entire land from north Carnatic to the southern part all the way to Mysore as he considered it as a religious duty to establish Islam by the sword.

References

Bibliography

1375 deaths
Bahmani Sultans
Year of birth unknown